Dmitry Alexandrovich Kudryashov (born 26 October 1985) is a Russian professional boxer who has challenged once for the WBA (Regular) cruiserweight title in 2017.

Early life 
At the age of eight he began to practice karate, and at the age of thirteen engaged in the practice of boxing under the guidance of coach Nikolai Timofeev. In 2008 he was drafted into the army, he served in Rostov-on-Don. In January 2011, he won the VII Russian tournament "A" in the box "Spartak Cup", for which he was awarded the degree of master of sport. Kudriaszow finished amateur career, posting a record: 150 fights, 138 wins, 12 defeats.

Professional career

Kudryashov vs. Okhrei 
Featuring Kudryashov began his professional career on 30 July 2011, by  defeating Ukrainian Oleksandr Okhrei via knockout in the third round.

Kudryashov vs. Mwekassa 
On 30 November 2013, in lyubertsy Kudryashov defeated Zack Mwekassa by knockout at the beginning of the first round.

Kudryashov vs. Bacurin 
May 23, 2014 won in Krasnodar, Russian by knockout in the seventh round of Croat Ivica Bacurin (17-5-1, 7 KOs).

Kudryashov vs. Ilie 
October 18, 2014 in Rostov-on-Don defeated by technical knockout after the second round Romanian Giuliana Ilie (20-7-2, 6 KOs).

Kudryashov vs. Gomez 
On 28 November 2014, in Moscow he knocked out Cuban Juan Carlos Gomez.

Kudryashov vs. Palacios 
On 10 April 2015, at the Moscow gala he defeated Puerto Rican Francisco Palacios in the first round.

Kudryashov vs. Makabu 
On 16 June 2019, Kudryashov fought Ilunga Makabu, who was ranked #4 by the WBC at cruiserweight. Makabu won by technical knockout in the 5th round.

Kudryashov vs. Tishchenko 
On 11 September 2021, Evgeny Tishchenko beat Dmitry Kudryashov by unanimous decision in their 10 round contest. Tishchenko was ranked #14 by the IBF at cruiserweight at the time. The scorecards read 100-89, 100-89, 99-90 in favor of Tishchenko.

Professional boxing record

References

External links

Dmitry Kudryashov - Profile, News Archive & Current Rankings at Box.Live

Living people
1985 births
Russian male boxers
People from Volgodonsk
Cruiserweight boxers
Sportspeople from Rostov Oblast